John Glenn High School is a public school that is part of Bangor Township Schools. This high school is located in Bangor Township, adjacent to Bay City, Michigan.

History
John Glenn High School which was opened in 1965 was named for astronaut John Glenn, who just three years prior had become the first American to orbit the earth.

Demographics
The demographic breakdown of the 851 students enrolled in 2018-19 was:

 Male - 52.3%
 Female - 47.7%
 Native American - 0.2%
 Asian - 1.1%
 Black - 1.1%
 Hispanic - 5.8%
 White - 87.8%
 Multiracial - 4.1%

In addition, 50.6% of students were eligible for reduced-price or free lunch.

References

External links
 Bangor Township Schools

Public high schools in Michigan
Bay City, Michigan
Educational institutions established in 1965
Schools in Bay County, Michigan
1965 establishments in Michigan